Marco Antonio Bustillo Benítez (born 1 August 1996) is a Venezuelan professional footballer who plays as a forward for Venezuelan Primera División side Metropolitanos.

Club career
Born in San Fernando, Bustillo began his career with Primera División side Carabobo. He made his professional debut for the club on 27 August 2017 against Atlético Venezuela. He came off the bench as a 79th minute substitute for Luis Mago as Carabobo won 3–1. After spending two seasons with the club, Bustillo left and signed with Metropolitanos, another Primera División side. He made his debut for the Metropolitanos on 16 March 2019 in the Copa Venezuela against Estudiantes de Caracas. Bustillo started and played the whole match as Metropolitanos fell 0–1.

Bustillo scored his first professional goal on 16 November 2019 in the league against Deportivo Táchira. His goal in the 5th minute was the first in a 2–0 victory. He then scored his second goal in his club's opening match of the 2020 season on 31 January 2020 against Aragua.

Career statistics

Club

References

1996 births
Living people
People from Apure
Venezuelan footballers
Association football forwards
Carabobo F.C. players
Metropolitanos FC players
Venezuelan Primera División players